Prêt-à-Porter, released in the United States as Ready to Wear (Prêt-à-Porter), is a 1994 American satirical comedy-drama film co-written, directed, and produced by Robert Altman and shot on location during the Paris Fashion Week with a host of international stars, models, and designers.

The film features an extensive ensemble cast, including Anouk Aimée, Marcello Mastroianni, Sophia Loren, Kim Basinger, Stephen Rea, Lauren Bacall, Julia Roberts, Tim Robbins, Lili Taylor, and Sally Kellerman.

Plot
Models, designers, industry hot shots and journalists gather for Paris Fashion Week, to work, bicker, and try to seduce each other. Early on, Fashion Council head Olivier de la Fontaine chokes to death on a sandwich, leaving behind a wife, a mistress, and a mysterious Russian companion who has fled the scene.

As the death is being investigated, Fashion Week continues. Injecting herself between the designers, American television personality Kitty gets sound bites from the high-fashion types throughout the length of the show.

Meanwhile, Anne and Joe are two American journalists, thrown together into the same over-booked room. They are meant to cover the show for their respective papers, but skip out on the majority of the festivities to have a hotel-room tryst during the week.

Three rival magazine editors from Harper's Bazaar, British Vogue and Elle vie for the exclusive services of Milo O'Brannigan, a trendy photographer who sexually humiliates the three; leading them to vow vengeance against him.

Sergei, a fading icon (and the mysterious Russian with Olivier when he died) and Isabella (Olivier's widow) hope to rekindle a romance from decades ago, but as they attempt to be intimate, Sergei falls asleep.

In the end, Fontaine's former mistress Simone sends her models down the catwalk nude in protest of her son Jack's (who incidentally had been cheating on his model girlfriend with another model) sale of her brand. Kitty quits on the spot, as the nudity confuses her. The final scene is of Olivier de la Fontaine's funeral procession, after the police declared him dead from choking on a sandwich.

Cast

The film includes various cameo appearances from fashion industry figures, including designers Jean-Paul Gaultier, Thierry Mugler, Sonia Rykiel, Christian LaCroix, Gianfranco Ferré, and Issey Miyake, and models such as Christy Turlington, Helena Christensen, Linda Evangelista, Claudia Schiffer, Carla Bruni, and Naomi Campbell. Cher, Rossy de Palma and Harry Belafonte also make cameos.

Production 
Robert Altman was inspired to make the film after accompanying his wife Kathryn to a Sonia Rykiel fashion show in Paris in 1984. "I couldn’t believe what I saw. It was such a circus. It was just too theatrical not to want to film," Altman said in a 1994 interview. For research, in the fall of 1993 Altman attended several fashion shows including those of Issey Miyake, Yohji Yamamoto, Jean-Paul Gaultier and Yves Saint Laurent. 

The film itself was shot at the 1994 Spring/Summer season of Paris Fashion Week.

Release
In the United States, the film was released on December 25, 1994 under the title Ready to Wear (Prêt-à-Porter), while the original title was used in other countries. The US DVD and VHS title was Robert Altman's Ready to Wear.

The film was R-rated by the Motion Picture Association of America (MPAA). However, following an advertisement by Columbia Records for the soundtrack album featuring a naked Helena Christensen in The New York Times which also said "See the Movie", the MPAA threatened to rescind its rating unless the company agreed not to use the image advertising the film.

For the film’s German release, a line referring to German designer Karl Lagerfeld as a "plagiarist" was removed. Though Lagerfeld had filed a court injunction against the film’s release in his home country, the film’s German distributor, Senator Film, agreed to cut the reference and the release went ahead as planned.

Box office
The film had a weak debut at the US box office. By the end of its run, the film grossed U$11,300,653 at the box office in the United States and Canada. It grossed $35.5 million internationally for a worldwide total of $46.8 million.

Critical reception
Prêt-à-Porter holds a 24% approval rating on Rotten Tomatoes based on 25 reviews, with an average rating of 4.75/10.

Roger Ebert gave the film two-and-a-half stars out of four and thought it "should have gone further and been meaner; too many of [Altman's] jokes are generic slapstick, instead of being aimed squarely at industry's targets." Gene Siskel gave it one-and-a-half out of four stars and called it "a true bomb as director Robert Altman, on a very hot streak, improbably finds absolutely nothing funny or fresh to say about the fashion industry and the 'journalists' who cover it with a wet kiss. Lacking a screenplay, Altman's intercutting among boring caricatures grows old quickly, and after 2½ hours, it may occur to you: 'I could have been shopping.'" Janet Maslin of The New York Times wrote that Altman's "laissez-faire satirical style proves ineffectual for shooting fish in this barrel. Fashion is too self-conscious to be skewered so casually." Rita Kempley of The Washington Post called the film "a mess" that was "most compelling when Altman turns his camera on the kitschy runway shows themselves ... Perhaps Altman should have made this film as a documentary instead." Kenneth Turan of the Los Angeles Times wrote that the film "sounds like Altman's most recent successes, 'The Player' and 'Short Cuts.' But there is a difference between creative improvisation and absolute chaos, and while those films were delicately balanced balls that magically stayed in the air, Ready to Wear, with a script credited to Altman and Barbara Shulgasser, has a haphazard 'Let's go to Paris and see what happens' feeling that wastes everyone's time and talent." Owen Gleiberman of Entertainment Weekly gave the film a grade of C- and wrote, "Virtually everything that happens is held up for our ridicule, yet it's never quite clear what we're supposed to be laughing at. The characters aren't really mocked for their attitudes, their obsessions with glamour and money and style. They aren't savaged in any specific, observational ways that could truly be called satirical. They're made fun of simply because they're silly, trivial human beings—walking punchlines in a joke that never arrives. It's like watching an Altman film that's been drained by a vampire."

John Simon of the National Review said Prêt-à-Porter was a picture that only a director's mother could love, and that the film, which has a runtime of over two hours, wears out its welcome in ten minutes.

The response from the fashion community was similarly tepid. In a review that was published in December 1994, fashion critic Suzy Menkes wrote, "For fashion folks, the film just didn’t come off - either as an extended skit, or as a bitchy or brutal dissection of the industry...Most people did not think that Altman had done for fashion with Ready to Wear what he did to the United States Army in M*A*S*H or for Hollywood in The Player."

Year-end lists
 8th worst – Janet Maslin, The New York Times
 Dishonorable mention – William Arnold, Seattle Post-Intelligencer

Accolades

Soundtrack
 "Here Comes the Hotstepper" (Heartical Mix) - Ini Kamoze
 "My Girl Josephine" - Super Cat
 "Here We Come" - Salt-N-Pepa
 "Natural Thing" - M People
 "70's Love Groove" - Janet Jackson
 "Jump On Top of Me" - The Rolling Stones
 "These Boots Are Made for Walkin'" - Sam Phillips
 "Pretty" (Remix) - The Cranberries
 "Third Time Lucky" - Basia
 "Martha" - Eric Mouquet, Michel Sanchez forming the group Deep Forest
 "Close to You" - The Brand New Heavies
 "Keep Givin' Me Your Love" (West End Mix) - Cece Peniston
 "Get Wild" - The New Power Generation
 "Supermodel Sandwich" - Terence Trent D'Arby
 "Lemon" (Perfecto Mix) - U2

Television adaptation 
In August 2021, it was reported that a television series adaptation of the film is in development at Paramount+. The project will be produced by Miramax Television.

References

External links
 
 
 
 

1994 films
1994 comedy-drama films
1994 independent films
1994 LGBT-related films
1990s English-language films
1990s French-language films
1990s Italian-language films
1990s Russian-language films
1990s satirical films
1990s Spanish-language films
American comedy-drama films
American independent films
American LGBT-related films
American satirical films
Cross-dressing in American films
Films about fashion in France
Films about television
Films directed by Robert Altman
Films scored by Michel Legrand
Miramax films
Films set in Paris
Films shot in Paris
Lesbian-related films
LGBT-related comedy-drama films
LGBT-related satirical films
1990s American films
Films about fashion in the United States